Latvija may refer to:

 The Latvian name for Latvia
 Latvija (automobile), a car brand of the former USSR car maker Riga Autobus Factory (RAF)
 Latvija (glider), on the List of gliders